Monastero is an Italian word meaning Monastery. It may refer to several Italian municipalities of Piedmont:

Monastero Bormida, in the Province of Asti
Monastero di Lanzo, in the Province of Turin
Monastero di Vasco, in the Province of Cuneo
 Villa Monastero in Varenna, Italy

See also
Monasterolo (disambiguation)